FACT was a Japanese post-hardcore band, formed in December 1999 in Ibaraki Prefecture.

Clean and screamed singing styles are both used, and gang vocals are present in many choruses. Even though a Japanese band, the lyrics to most of the band's songs are written in English.

The members have hidden their faces during every video since 2009 wearing traditional Japanese Noh masks during the time they supported their second album, Fact (2009), but abandoned the imagery in videos the next year{{clarify|date=February 2013|reason=sentence just doesn't make sense timing wise.  is it trying to say "prior to the release of fact", the band wore the noh masks, but at fact album's release the changed to partially or fully"? (are "noh" masks not fully?)}} in favor of either partially or fully concealing their faces.

They were signed to Maximum10, an indie-rock imprint of the Avex Group until they disbanded in 2015.

History
The band was formed from members of other bands in the Tokyo area. They then began to tour the local music scene in and around Chiba, Mito and Tokyo. Originally, Tomohiro played bass and sang with support from Kazuki and Takahiro but, in 2002, main vocal duties as well as a third guitar were added when Hironobu joined. Hironobu had been a member of the band Second Base along with Kazuki before either of them joined Fact.

Continuing onward as a group, the band traveled to the United States, specifically California for a short tour in 2003.

In 2006, they released their first full-length album Never Turn Out the Light to Keep Myself on Japan's Bullion Records (a sublabel of Wave Master).

The band later signed a record deal sometime between 2008 and 2009 with Vagrant Records to release Fact, their worldwide début album. A single from the album, "A Fact of Life", was released with an accompanying video in early 2009. In support of the album, the band toured the U.S. accompanying American bands, including post-hardcore A Skylit Drive, metalcore Greeley Estates, metal Iwrestledabearonce, metal Memphis May Fire and post-hardcore Senses Fail. Their tour was abruptly cut short after a car collision early on, injuring drummer Eiji, but another U.S. tour was rescheduled soon after.

Their third full-length album, In the Blink of an Eye, was released on 13 January 2010, and its first single, "Slip of the Lip" was released online with an accompanying music video. The album débuted at number six on the Japanese Oricon weekly charts, becoming their first album to reach the top ten.

The band returned to the UK in support of In The Blink of an Eye for a second tour of the country between 24 May and 4 June 2010, with a headlining show at London's O2 Academy Islington and then playing as the support act for the American electronic-rock duo Breathe Carolina during the rest of the dates.

Their single "A Fact of Life" was featured in Konami's rhythm music game Jubeat.

In 2011, they released the singles "Attack Me If You Dare",  "Error" and "The Shadow of Envy", all of which were later featured in their extended-play album Eat Your Words.

On 11 January 2012, the band released their fourth album, Burundanga, which features their newest member, Adam (from the United Kingdom), on guitar.

On 27 January 2014 the band released a new single titled Disclosure. The song is the first single off fifth record titled, Witness'', available in Japan on 5 March 2014 and worldwide shortly after. And over a year later, their sixth and final record titled KTHEAT was released. This continued their hardcore punk stylistic direction present on Witness. However, after the release the band decided to go on permanent hiatus. From the hiatus formed two bands, with Hironobu Onose fronting the melodic hardcore band "Shadows" and Adam Graham fronting the dark alternative rock band "Joy Opposites."

Members
All band members are credited by either their first name or stage name.

  – lead vocals (since 2002)
  – rhythm guitar, backing vocals (since 1999)
  – drums, percussion, backing vocals (since 1999)
  – bass, backing vocals (since 1999); lead vocals (1999–2002)
  – lead guitar, backing vocals (since 1999)
 Adam Graham – guitar, backing vocals (since 2012)

Past members
  – drums

Style
FACT has typically been described as Post-hardcore. However, with the release of their second album, their style seemed to follow elements of melodic hardcore much more than the precursor. They often incorporate elements of metalcore and mathcore, with latter especially appearing after the release of their third album "In the Blink of an Eye." Their fourth record saw an incorporation of much more electronic elements. On their fifth and sixth records, Witness and KTHEAT, they approached their sound from a more traditional hardcore punk perspective. Most of their compositions consist of melodic lead vocals accompanied by gang vocals, rhythmically complex guitar riffs, technical drumming with emphasis on double bass, changing time signatures, and fast upbeat tempos ranging from 180 to 220 bpm.

Discography

Albums

Remixes

Extended plays

Singles

Videography

See also

 List of artists under the Avex Group
 List of post-hardcore bands
 List of Universal Records artists

References

External links
 , the band's official website
 

1999 establishments in Japan
Japanese hardcore punk groups
Musical groups established in 1999
Musical quintets
Post-hardcore groups
Avex Group artists
Hassle Records artists
Vagrant Records artists
Masked musicians
Musical groups from Ibaraki Prefecture